Cyberchump is an electro-organic duo created by multi-media artist Mark G. E.  and musician Jim Skeel.  The band members live in different cities and have made a point of long distance collaboration utilizing the internet.  Cyberchump is played on numerous national radio programs such as Echoes, Music from the Hearts of Space, Starstreams and internationally on programs such as Ultima Thule Ambient Music, as well as Pandora.

Music critic and founder of the Art of Noise, Paul Morley lists Cyberchump’s Dreams Grooves as “One of 88 albums" you need to hear in his book Words and Music: the history of pop in the shape of a city.

Jason Kiel in The Shepherd Express describe the duo’s collaborative dynamic by noting that “Skeel's tendencies to jam are an intriguing counterpoint to Mark G.E.'s  methodical experimentation.”

Additional guest musicians have included John Kruth, Mike Kashou, who played bass on the first Garbage (album), Jason Loveall from The Danglers, Jason Todd, and a telephone call cameo from Victor DeLorenzo  of the Violent Femmes.  A number of their album covers have been created by international surrealist artist J. Karl Bogartte (Chicago Surrealist Group), whose work, among other places, is in the collection of the Milwaukee Art Museum.

Their music appears in the documentary “Maybe A Baby” by filmmaker Theresa Ala Mode and Ross Bigley's film "Zombie Frat House."

Mark G. E.’s  film “The Unfortunate Gift” has been accepted into the Edward Gorey House Archive.

Cyberchump have numerous full length releases such as Dreams Groove, Inner Grooves, Abstract Air, Scientists in the Trees, Secrets to Tell You, Sankhara, Our Wizards of Earth, Their Moment of Perfect Happiness, Flutter and Flow, The Construction of Things, After.   In addition, they have had songs on compilations released by Om Records, and Spiralight  and Chi-Qi .

Cyberchump are regularly interviewed on the radio with numerous two- and three-hour specials by Mary Bartlein on WMSE and Jim Lange’s Eclectopia which airs on West Virginia Public Radio.

Band Websites:

 cyberchump.com

1. Words and Music; Bloomsbury Publishing PLC (4 Aug 2003) 

2. http://www.onmilwaukee.com/music/articles/cyberchump.html

3. http://www.maybeababy.com

References

Ambient music groups